Francisco 'Fran' Javier Zafra de los Santos (born 28 March 1993), is a Spanish footballer who plays for AD Ceuta on loan from San Fernando as a midfielder.

Club career
Born in Seville, Andalusia, Zafra made his senior debuts with Racing Club Portuense, in the 2009–10 season, but returned to youth football, playing with Xerez CD. He was promoted to the club's B-team in the 2011–12 season, and made his first team debut on 20 April 2013, playing the last 24 minutes of a 1–2 home loss against UD Las Palmas in the Segunda División championship.

In August 2013 Zafra signed with Córdoba CF, being assigned to the reserves in Segunda División B. He subsequently resumed his career in the third level but also in Tercera División, representing San Fernando CD and Atlético Sanluqueño CF.

References

External links

1993 births
Living people
People from Seville
Spanish footballers
Footballers from Andalusia
Association football midfielders
Segunda División players
Segunda División B players
Tercera División players
Xerez CD B players
Xerez CD footballers
Córdoba CF B players
Atlético Sanluqueño CF players
CF Villanovense players